The girls' singles luge at the 2016 Winter Youth Olympics took place on 15 February at the Lillehammer Olympic Bobsleigh and Luge Track.

Results

References

External links
Results

Luge at the 2016 Winter Youth Olympics